Patricia A. Berglund is a researcher at the University of Michigan's Institute for Social Research. She was included in the 2014, 2015 and 2016 Clarivate Analytics lists of "highly cited researchers" in the fields of psychiatry and psychology.

She is an advocate for the expansion of screening and improvement in treatment quality for major depressive disorder, arguing that failure to make prompt initial treatment contact is a pervasive shortcoming of mental health care in the United States.

Background and career 
Berglund's hometown is Waukesha, Wisconsin, and she earned a BA in Music from Northwestern University's Bienen School of Music and an MBA from the Kellogg School of Management at Northwestern University in 1988. Before joining the University of Michigan in 1993, she worked as a tennis teacher and research analyst.

Berglund has authored or co-authored several books and publications and is an instructor for courses in data analysis and SAS software. Currently, her research focuses on mental health using national and global mental health surveys such as Monitoring the Future, the National Comorbidity Survey, and the World Mental Health survey initiative.

The SAS Institute has awarded her its Best Contributed Paper title in Statistics and Data Analysis.

Works
Journal articles

Books
"Multiple Imputation of Missing Data Using SAS" (SAS Institute, 2014)  
"Applied Survey Data Analysis" (CRC Press, 2010) co-author with Steven G. Heeringa and Brady T. West.

References

Living people
American medical researchers
Bienen School of Music alumni
Women medical researchers
Kellogg School of Management alumni
Year of birth missing (living people)
American psychologists